Mostak Ahmad is an athlete and veteran of the Bangladesh Liberation War. He was awarded the Independence Day Award, Bangladesh's "highest civilian award" in 1977 for outstanding achievements in sports.

Career 
Ahmed began his career as a soldier. He directly participated in the Bangladesh Liberation war.

Awards 
He was awarded the "Independence Day Award" in 1977 for his unique general skill in sports.

References

Recipients of the Independence Day Award